This is a list of members of the Australian Senate from 1913 to 1914. Half of its members were elected at the 13 April 1910 election and had terms starting on 1 July 1910 and finishing on 30 June 1916; the other half were elected at the 31 May 1913 election and had terms starting on 1 July 1913 and finishing on 30 June 1919. In fact their terms were terminated prematurely with the calling of the 5 September 1914 election as a double dissolution.

Notes

References

Members of Australian parliaments by term
20th-century Australian politicians
Australian Senate lists